Abdul Hamid Abdullah Iswandi (born 1 January 1991) is an Indonesian athlete competing in sprinting events. He represented his country at the 2016 World Indoor Championships without advancing from the first round.

Competition record

Personal bests
Outdoor
100 metres – 10.41 (+0.7 m/s, Rumbai 2012)
200 metres – 21.50 (+1.0 m/s, Jakarta 2013)
Indoor
60 metres – 6.77 (Portland 2016)

References

All-Athletics profile

1991 births
Living people
Indonesian male sprinters
Competitors at the 2013 Southeast Asian Games
Competitors at the 2015 Southeast Asian Games
Competitors at the 2017 Southeast Asian Games
Southeast Asian Games silver medalists for Indonesia
Southeast Asian Games bronze medalists for Indonesia
Southeast Asian Games medalists in athletics
Competitors at the 2013 Summer Universiade
20th-century Indonesian people
21st-century Indonesian people